Luděk Vejmola (born 3 November 1994) is a professional Czech football goalkeeper, currently playing for 1. SK Prostějov.

He made his senior league debut for Kolín on 8 March 2015 in a Czech National Football League 0–0 home draw against Karviná.

References

External links 
 
 Luděk Vejmola official international statistics
 
 Luděk Vejmola profile on the FK Mladá Boleslav official website
 Luděk Vejmola profile on the FC Vysočina Jihlava official website

1994 births
Living people
People from Vyškov
Czech footballers
Czech expatriate footballers
Association football goalkeepers
Czech Republic youth international footballers
Sportspeople from the South Moravian Region
FK Drnovice players
1. FC Slovácko players
FC Vysočina Jihlava players
FK Kolín players
FK Mladá Boleslav players
FK Haugesund players
1. SK Prostějov players
Czech First League players
Czech National Football League players
Czech expatriate sportspeople in Norway
Expatriate footballers in Norway